The 2003–04 season will be Ferencvárosi TC's102nd competitive season, 102nd consecutive season in the Borsodi Liga and 104th year in existence as a football club.

Squad

Transfers

Summer

In:

Out:

Source:

Winter

In:

Out:

Source:

Competitions

Overview

Nemzeti Bajnokság I

First stage

Second stage

Results summary

Results by round

Matches

Hungarian Cup

UEFA Cup

Appearances and goals
Last updated on 27 May 2004.

|-
|colspan="14"|Youth players:

|-
|colspan="14"|Out to loan:

|-
|colspan="14"|Players no longer at the club:
|}

Top scorers
Includes all competitive matches. The list is sorted by shirt number when total goals are equal.
Last updated on 27 May 2004

Disciplinary record
Includes all competitive matches. Players with 1 card or more included only.

Last updated on 27 May 2004

Clean sheets
Last updated on 27 May 2004

References

External links
 Official Website
 UEFA
 fixtures and results

2003-04
Hungarian football clubs 2003–04 season